The 16th General Assembly of Nova Scotia represented Nova Scotia between 1840 and 1843. The assembly was dissolved on October 26, 1843.

The assembly sat at the pleasure of the Governor of Nova Scotia, Lucius Bentinck Cary.

Joseph Howe was chosen as speaker for the house.

List of members

Notes:

References
Journal and proceedings of the House of Assembly, 1841 (1841)

Terms of the General Assembly of Nova Scotia
1840 in Canada
1841 in Canada
1842 in Canada
1843 in Canada
1840 establishments in Nova Scotia
1843 disestablishments in Nova Scotia